George Charles Kavel (May 3, 1910 – July 15, 1995) was an American football player who played for the Pittsburgh Pirates and Philadelphia Eagles of the National Football League. Kavel played college football at Carnegie Mellon University.

References

1910 births
1995 deaths
American football running backs
Pittsburgh Pirates (football) players
Philadelphia Eagles players
Players of American football from Pennsylvania